Lincoln Townley (born 27 December 1972) is an English self-taught painter who explores the darker side of the human personality, painting abstract portraits of celebrities. He lives in Cheshire and in London.

Career 
Before turning to art as a career in his 40s, Townley was a celebrity publicist and PR manager.

From 2015 - 2017 Townley was artist in residence at Marriott Canary Wharf.  Townley's work has been featured in The Royal Academy in 2015 and 2016. He has been commissioned to paint the world's biggest icons by Mastercard and commissioned by The British Academy of Film and Television Arts Los Angeles to paint celebrities in 2016 and 2017. His painting of boxer Muhammad Ali sold for $623,000 in 2017.

Personal life 
Townley married Beverley Scales in 1992, with whom he has a son. He married actress Denise Welch in 2013. He appeared as her dancing partner on 'Stepping Out' on ITV in 2013 shortly after their marriage.

References

1972 births
Living people
English artists